The Russian Wikipedia is the Russian-language edition of Wikipedia. It was started on 11 May 2001. In October 2015, it became the sixth-largest Wikipedia by the number of articles. It has the sixth-largest number of edits. In June 2020, it was the world's 6th most visited language Wikipedia after the English Wikipedia, the Japanese Wikipedia, the Spanish Wikipedia, the German Wikipedia and the French Wikipedia.

It is the largest Wikipedia written in any Slavic language, surpassing its nearest rival, the Polish Wikipedia, eightfold by the parameter of depth. In addition, the Russian Wikipedia is the largest Wikipedia written in Cyrillic or in a script other than Latin script. In April 2016, the project had 3,377 active editors who made at least five edits in that month, ranking third behind the English and Spanish versions. It is the most popular Wikipedia in many former Soviet republics and the second most popular in others, owing its position in the national language status that Russian had in the Soviet era and the Russification policies during the Soviet Union, and Russian continues to be the second language of most of these states. As of 2022, most notably, it is the most popular language version of Wikipedia in both Russia and Ukraine.

Since the early 2010s, Russian Wikipedia and its editors have experienced numerous and increasing threats of nationwide blocks and country-wide enforcement of blacklisting by the Russian government, as well as several attempts at Internet censorship, propaganda, and disinformation, more recently during the 2014 Russo-Ukrainian war in the Donbas region and the 2022 Russian invasion of Ukraine.

Policies
Difficult issues are resolved through the Arbitration Committee, which handles content disputes, blocks users or prohibits certain users from editing articles on certain topics.

Administrators (currently ) are elected through a vote; a minimum quorum of 30 voters and 66% of support votes are required if the request is to be considered successful. Administrators who have become inactive (i.e. have not used administrative tools, such as "delete" or "block" buttons, at least 25 times in six months) may lose their privileges by an Arbitration Committee decision.

Content
As of 1 June 2012, some of the biggest categories (which contain more than 5,000 articles) in the Russian Wikipedia are:
176,411 biographical articles. Although the Western name order (given name(s) followed by family name) is generally used in Russian, the Russian Wikipedia uses lexical order (last name, comma, given name(s) and also the patronymic for most people from ex-Soviet countries) for all articles on non-fictional persons. This order has been traditionally used in major Russian language encyclopedias, like the Great Soviet Encyclopedia.
144,322 human settlements articles.
28,187 river articles
19,302 film articles
16,925 animal articles
16,517 scientific articles
16,133 surname articles
13,936 footballers' articles
11,247 Musicians' articles
10,755 Writers' articles
9,243 album articles
9,237 articles on recipients of the Order of Lenin
7,307 Company's articles
6,734 plant articles
6,574 street articles
6,265 NGC astronomical articles
6,157 actors articles
5,719 artist articles
5,580 music group articles
5,292 Hero of the Soviet Union articles

10,340 articles contain material from the Brockhaus and Efron Encyclopedic Dictionary. More than 47,000 articles were translated from the English Wikipedia.

Namespaces
In addition to common Wikipedia namespaces, the Russian Wikipedia has three custom ones: "Incubator" (# 102–103) – which is used as a training camp for new users and their first articles, "Project" (# 104–105) – for Wikipedia projects and "Arbitration" (# 106–107) – for arbitration requests.

User pages 
On user pages, users are able to see their outreach, the cumulative view count of pages they have edited.

Reception

In 2015, a professor at University of Tartu, in an interview opined that articles related to humanities in the Russian Wikipedia are of considerably inferior quality compared to English Wikipedia, and some articles even deteriorate with time. He suggested that this effect is due to overzealous policing of intellectual property rights by the community and bemoaned poor editing skills of some Wikipedians.

In 2022, the San Francisco Examiner praised the Russian Wikipedia for "filling the information vacuum" while "independent media abandon Russia or are censored" during the 2022 Russian invasion of Ukraine. For the safety of Wikipedians, all editors' names in the page about the Russian invasion in Ukraine are routinely erased.

Timeline

 The main page was created on 7 November 2002.
 On 30 December 2004, the 10,000th article was created.
 On 23 December 2005, the 50,000th article was created.
 On 16 August 2006, the 100,000th article was created.
 On 29 November 2006, the Russian Wikipedia received the National Runet Award in the Educational section.
 On 10 March 2007, the 150,000th article was created.
 On 4 September 2007, the 200,000th article was created.
 On 27 November 2007, the Russian Wikipedia received the National Runet Award in the Educational section.
 On 17 March 2008, the 250,000th article was created.
 On 18 July 2008, the 300,000th article was created.
 On 22 January 2009, the 350,000th article was created.
 On 16 June 2009, the 400,000th article was created.
 On 25 November 2009, the Russian Wikipedia received the National Runet Award in the Science and Education section.
 On 25 February 2010, the 500,000th article was created.
 On 8 October 2010, the 600,000th article was created.
 On 12 April 2011, the 700,000th article was created.
 On 10 December 2011, the 800,000th article was created.
 On 8 September 2012, the 900,000th article was created.
 On 11 May 2013, the 1,000,000th article was created.
 On 27 March 2014, the 1,100,000th article was created.
 On 19 March 2015, the 1,200,000th article was created.
 On 29 March 2016, the 1,300,000th article was created.
 On 14 June 2017, the 1,400,000th article was created.
 On 1 October 2018, the 1,500,000th article was created.
 On 26 February 2020, the 1,600,000th article was created.
 On 17 February 2021, the 1,700,000th article was created.
 On 4 March 2022, the 1,800,000th article was created.

History

Early years

The Russian Wikipedia was created on 20 May 2001 in the first wave of non-English Wikipedias, along with editions in Catalan, Chinese, Dutch, German, Esperanto, French, Hebrew, Italian, Japanese, Portuguese, Spanish, and Swedish.

The first edit of the Russian Wikipedia was on 24 May 2001, and consisted of the line ("Russia is a great nation"). The following edit changed it to the joke:  ("Russia is the motherland of elephants (big-eared, improved cross-country capability, see Mammoth.")

For a long time development was slow (especially after some participants left for WikiZnanie), but in the 12-month period between February 2005 and February 2006 it surpassed nine editions in other languages – the Catalan, Bulgarian, Ukrainian, Hebrew, Finnish, Norwegian, Chinese, Esperanto, and Danish Wikipedias.
In 2006, 2007, 2009 and 2010 the Russian Wikipedia won the "Science and education" category of the "Runet Prize" award, supervised by the Russian government agency FAPMC.

Troubles with the Russian government

On 10 July 2012, Russian Wikipedia closed access to its content for 24 hours in protest against proposed amendments to Russia's Information Act (Bill No. 89417-6) regulating the accessibility of Internet-based information to children. Among other things, the bill stipulates the creation and country-wide enforcement of blacklists, which would block access to forbidden sites. Several aspects of this amendment drew criticism from various civil rights activists and Internet providers.

Supporters of the amendment stated that it is aimed only at widely prohibited content such as child pornography and similar information, but the Russian Wikimedia chapter has declared that conditions for determining the content falling under this law will create a thing like the "great Chinese firewall". They further claimed that existing Russian legal practice demonstrates a high likelihood of a worst-case scenario, resulting in a country-wide ban of Wikipedia. The second and the third readings of the law were held in the State Duma on 11 July; no essential corrections were introduced. The law will come into force after three readings in the State Duma, one reading in the Federation Council and presidential approval.

On 10 July, Nikolai Nikiforov, Russian Minister for Telecommunications and Mass Media announced in his Twitter account, that the organization of the List of the prohibited websites (that was sited on the Law Project No. 89417-6) will be suspended until 1 November 2012. On the same day Yelena Mizulina, a Duma deputy and the head of the subcommittee which sponsored the law, said that the blackout is an attempt to blackmail the Duma and was sponsored by the "pedophile lobby".

Also, since 2012, Russian foreign agent law resulted in reduced funding available for the Russian Wikipedia and its volunteers, who no longer can receive financial aid from abroad, including their share of funds raised through global Wikipedia fundraisers.

On 5 April 2013, it was confirmed by a spokesperson for the Federal Service for Supervision of Communications, Information Technology and Mass Media that Wikipedia had been blacklisted over the article "Курение каннабиса" ("Cannabis smoking") on Russian Wikipedia. On 31 March 2013, The New York Times reported that Russia was 'Selectively Blocking [the] Internet', though Wikipedia itself was not blocked at that time.

Articles on Russian Wikipedia, and also on other Wikipedia versions, concerning the shoot down of flight MH17 and the 2014 Russo-Ukrainian war in the Donbas region have been targeted by Internet propaganda outlets associated with the Putin-led Russian government. Some of the edits were spotted by a Twitter bot which monitors Wikipedia edits made from Russian government IP addresses.

The entire Russian Wikipedia was blocked in the Russian Federation for a few hours in August 2015 due to the contents of the article on charas.

In November 2019, Russian president Vladimir Putin called for a government-run alternative to Wikipedia. The Guardian reported state funds had already been allocated according to official documents published the previous September. The new electronic alternative was intended to be based on the Great Russian Encyclopedia. According to the London Times, the proposal had been abandoned by mid-May 2020, however, according to Great Russian Encyclopedia employee Yekaterina Chukovskaya, only the working group was disbanded and work on the project as a whole will continue.

In June 2022, Runiversalis, a pro-Moscow partial fork of the Russian Wikipedia, was launched. The site launched with only 9000 articles, a tiny subset of the 1.85 million articles on the Russian Wikipedia, with many articles being taken unmodified from the Russian Wikipedia.

Censorship and disinformation during the Russo-Ukrainian War

In February and March 2022, in the first week following the Russian invasion of Ukraine and breakout of the Russo-Ukrainian War, Russian Wikipedia editors warned their readers and fellow editors of several, reiterated attempts by the Putin-led Russian government of political censorship, Internet propaganda, disinformation attacks, and disruptive editing towards an article listing of Russian military casualties as well as Ukrainian civilians and children due to the ongoing war. The Wikipedia was generally considered under threat in Russia.

On 11 March 2022, Belarusian political police GUBOPiK arrested and detained editor of Russian Wikipedia from Minsk Mark Bernstein, who was editing the Wikipedia article about the Russian invasion of Ukraine, accusing him of the "spread of anti-Russian materials" and of violating Russian "fake news" laws.

On 1 November 2022, the Wikimedia Foundation was fined 2 million rubles by a Russian court for not deleting two articles on Russian Wikipedia. On 28 February 2023, the Wikimedia Foundation was fined another 2 million rubles after accusations of failing to delete "misinformation".

References

External links

 Russian Language Wikipedia
 Russian Wikipedia mobile version
The embassy of the Russian-language Wikipedia
 Wikipedia explains everything YouTube shows everything 

Wikipedias by language
Wikipedia
Internet properties established in 2001
Russian-language encyclopedias
Blacklisting
2001 establishments in Russia